William Louis Fiesinger (October 25, 1877 – September 11, 1953) was an American politician. A Democrat, he served in the United States House of Representatives from 1931-1937 representing Ohio's 13th district.

Early life 
Born in Willard, Ohio, Fiesinger was educated in the public schools of Norwalk, Ohio. He graduated from the law department of Baldwin-Wallace University, Berea, Ohio, in 1901.

Legal career 
He was admitted to the bar the same year and commenced practice in Sandusky, Ohio. He served as city solicitor of Sandusky 1903-1909. He served as judge of the Common Pleas Court of Erie County 1925-1931.

Political career 
Fiesinger was elected as a Democrat to the Seventy-second, Seventy-third, and Seventy-fourth Congresses (March 4, 1931 – January 3, 1937). He was an unsuccessful candidate for renomination in 1936. He resumed the practice of law in Sandusky, Ohio.

He died in Cleveland, Ohio, September 11, 1953. He was interred in Oakland Cemetery, Sandusky, Ohio.

Sources

1877 births
1953 deaths
Politicians from Sandusky, Ohio
Baldwin Wallace University alumni
Democratic Party members of the United States House of Representatives from Ohio
People from Willard, Ohio